The Salmon Tandem Monoplane was a single-seat sport aeroplane produced for the 1923 Lympne light aircraft trials. The aeroplane failed to fly.

Development 
With prizes worth a total of £2,150, the Lympne light aircraft competition of October 1923 attracted 28 entries including the Tandem Monoplane which was given competition number 27.

The aircraft was a single-seat tandem winged aero designed and built by Percy Salmon at Farnborough, England. It was powered by a  Bradshaw motorcycle engine driving a tractor propeller mounted at the end of a strut-braced driveshaft. It was registered as G-EBHQ on 23 March 1923 and was ready to fly by September 1923. Several take-off attempts were made by Flying Officer Cecil Bouchier, but they were unsuccessful. The aircraft was stored at Farnborough until it was later burnt.

References

Notes

Bibliography 

Ellis, Ken British Homebuilt Aircraft since 1929. Liverpool, England:Merseyside Aviation Society, 1979. 

1920s British sport aircraft
Abandoned civil aircraft projects of the United Kingdom
Single-engined tractor aircraft
Tandem-wing aircraft